Formica integroides, also known as the Vinegar Ant, is a species of ant in the family Formicidae.

References

Further reading

External links

 

integroides
Articles created by Qbugbot
Insects described in 1913